Alfa Rugby Bydgoszcz is a Polish rugby club based in Bydgoszcz.

References

Polish rugby union teams
Sport in Bydgoszcz